The Savage Garden is the second novel written by British author Mark Mills. Set in 1958, the story tells of Cambridge student Adam Strickland and his trip to Tuscany, Italy; which started off as a chance to study the old, Italian renaissance architecture of a garden owned by the aristocratic Docci family and results in Adam solving two murders: one from the 16th century and one just after World War II. His discoveries shake the entire lineage of the Docci clan including his love interest Antonella's life.

Characters
Adam Strickland – the story's protagonist, an English student studying at The University of Cambridge who goes to Tuscany to study the Docci family's Villa.
Signora Francesca Doccci
Maria Docci
Maurizio Docci
Harry Strickland – Harry is Adam's older, fun-loving brother. Harry is a sculptor who often gets into little problems and disagreements with people; resulting in Adam having to help him out of them on some occasions.
Signora Fanelli – owner of The Pensione Amorini, the bar/restaurant above which Adam stayed. She is in a relationship with Fausto.
Fausto
Professor Crispin Leonard – one of Adam's lecturers and (unbeknown to him) father of Emilio Docci.
Maria – the housekeeper to the Docci Villa and a confidant to Signora Docci. Maria became a key player in keeping Signora Docci's plan from both Maurizio and Adam.
Emilio Docci – Signora Docci's son and secretly fathered by Professor Leonard. He was killed by his half brother Maurizio.
Chiara Docci – Maurizio's academic wife.
Antonella - She is the granddaughter of Signora Docci and daughter of Caterina. She is a fashion designer and has played a mysterious character on a little flirtatious note with Adam. Later on, the love affair between Adam and her becomes strong, and they eventually end up together on a happy note. Mark Mills did a great job to raise suspicions around her character in a subtle way which somehow makes the protagonist, and the reader as well, believe that she deceived Adam.

See also

Mark Mills (writer)
The House at Riverton, a similar novel

External links
 The Savage Garden on FantasticFiction.co.uk
 A review of The Savage Garden on Eurocrime.co.uk

2007 British novels
Crime novels
Fiction set in 1958
Novels set in Tuscany
HarperCollins books